Glyceraldehyde-3-phosphate dehydrogenase (NADP+) (GAPN) is an enzyme that irreversibly catalyzes the oxidation of glyceraldehyde-3-phosphate (GAP) to 3-phosphoglycerate (3-PG or 3-PGA) using the reduction of NADP+ to NADPH. GAPN is used in a variant of glycolysis that conserves energy as NADPH rather than as ATP. The NADPH and 3-PG can then be used for synthesis. The most familiar variant of glycolysis uses glyceraldehyde-3-phosphate dehydrogenase (GAPDH) and phosphoglycerate kinase to produce ATP. GAPDH is phosphorylating. GAPN is non-phosphorylating.

GAPN was reported first by Rosenberg and Arnon in 1954. It has been found in plants, algae, and bacteria.

Reactions
Glyceraldehyde-3-phosphate dehydrogenase (NADP+) catalyzes
GAP + NADP+ + H2O → 3-PG + NADPH + H+

Glyceraldehyde-3-phosphate dehydrogenase and phosphoglycerate kinase catalyze
GAP + NAD+ + Pi  1,3-bisphosphoglycerate + NADH + H+
1,3-bisphosphoglycerate + ADP  3-PG + ATP

Usually [NADPH] / [NADP+] >> 1 >> [NADH] / [NAD+].

See also
 Pentose phosphate pathway

References

EC 1.2.1